Haris Medunjanin (born 8 March 1985) is a Bosnian professional footballer who plays as a midfielder for Eerste Divisie club PEC Zwolle.

He started his professional career at AZ, who loaned him to Sparta Rotterdam in 2006. In 2008 he joined Valladolid, before signing with Maccabi Tel Aviv two years later. He was loaned to Gaziantepspor in 2012, signing on a permanent basis the following season; in 2016 he returned to Maccabi and, one year later, moved to the Philadelphia Union.

Medunjanin represented the Netherlands at under-21 level, but in 2009 he decided to play for Bosnia and Herzegovina as a senior. His international career lasted until 2018, with the highlight being appearing at the 2014 FIFA World Cup.

Club career

AZ
Medunjanin made his Eredivisie debut on 20 February 2005, with AZ Alkmaar. During his three-year spell, however, opportunities were scarce.

For the 2006–07 season, he was loaned to Sparta Rotterdam, being essential as the modest club finished 13th by scoring seven league goals.

Valladolid
After another unassuming campaign in Alkmaar, Medunjanin was acquired by Spain's Real Valladolid in August 2008, being relatively used in his first year (mainly as a substitute).

In 2009–10, Medunjanin netted all of his five La Liga goals as a late substitute. In January 2010, he and other teammates were fined €6,000 for breaching club discipline by "engaging in untimely nocturnal activities", and the team was also eventually relegated.

Maccabi Tel Aviv
Medunjanin signed a four-year contract with Maccabi Tel Aviv F.C. in Israel in July 2010, for €1.8 million. He made his official debut for his new team on the 15th in a UEFA Europa League second qualifying round against FK Mogren, and scored in the 2–0 home win.

Gaziantepspor
On 31 August 2012, Medunjanin signed with Turkish side Gaziantepspor on loan from Maccabi. The move was made permanent before the start of the following season, on a three-year deal.

Deportivo
On 12 August 2014, after a successful medical, free agent Medunjanin joined Deportivo de La Coruña. On 29 January 2016, having been deemed surplus to requirements by new manager Víctor Sánchez, he terminated his contract, and agreed to a one-and-a-half-year deal with his former club Maccabi Tel Aviv two days later.

Medunjanin helped Maccabi qualify to the Europa League group stage in his second season.

Philadelphia Union

On 31 January 2017, Major League Soccer club Philadelphia Union signed Medunjanin to a two-year deal with an option for a third. He made his debut in the season opener, in a 0–0 away draw against the Vancouver Whitecaps FC. He scored his first goal for his new team on 14 May 2017, contributing to a 4–0 victory at D.C. United; on 27 November, he was named their Player of the Year after contributing 12 assists and two goals.

Becoming one of the Union's core midfielders, Medunjanin's contract option was picked up for the 2019 campaign. He helped the side earn their best season to date by playing every minute in the league, also leading all MLS players in total passes (2,571), total completed passes (2,182), passes in the opponent's half (1,521) and completed passes in the opponent's half (1,217) according to Opta.

On 20 November 2019, Medunjanin was released. During the MLS waiver draft, his rights were selected by FC Cincinnati.

FC Cincinnati
On 5 December 2019, aged 34, Mendunjanin joined FC Cincinnati. He scored his first goal for his new team the following 19 September, with a game-winning olympic corner kick against the New York Red Bulls. 

Medunjanin left the TQL Stadium in August 2022, by mutual consent.

PEC Zwolle
On 9 August 2022, Medunjanin returned to the Netherlands after 14 years, on a one-year contract at PEC Zwolle.

International career

Netherlands
Medunjanin was part of the Netherlands under-21 team that won the 2006 tournament of the UEFA European Championship. He was also called by coach Foppe de Haan for his squad in the 2007 tournament, held in the Netherlands; the nation went on to retain its title by beating Serbia 4–1 in the final, and in the process qualify for the 2008 Olympic Games in Beijing.

Bosnia and Herzegovina

In a 2009 interview, Medunjanin expressed strong desire to play for his native Bosnia and Herzegovina. In August of the same year, his paperwork for change of footballing citizenship was submitted to FIFA and, on 31 October 2009, national coach Miroslav Blažević invited the player for the 2010 FIFA World Cup playoff games against Portugal. He made his debut – as a starter – in the decisive second leg, a 0–1 loss in Zenica (0–2 on aggregate).

Medunjanin scored his first international goal on 17 November 2010, in a friendly with Slovakia. In the UEFA Euro 2012 qualifying campaign, he contributed three goals against Albania (2–0, home), Belarus (2–0, away) and Luxembourg (5–0 at home), helping Bosnia to the second place in their group and to qualify for play-offs.

On 2 June 2014, Medunjanin was named in the squad for 2014 FIFA World Cup. He made his debut in the tournament 14 days later, playing the last 16 minutes of a 2–1 group stage loss to Argentina.

On 13 October 2015, Medunjanin scored a crucial brace against Cyprus to help Bosnia and Herzegovina reach the Euro 2016 play-offs after the 3–2 away win. In 2016, he captained the nation during the Kirin Cup winning campaign, the first match being against Denmark on 3 June.

Medunjanin announced his retirement from international football on 27 March 2018, after playing in a friendly with Senegal which marked his 60th cap.

Personal life
Medunjanin was born in Sarajevo, Socialist Republic of Bosnia and Herzegovina, Socialist Federal Republic of Yugoslavia. After the outbreak of Bosnian War in 1992, he moved to the Netherlands at the age of seven with his mother and sister, whilst his father was unable to leave, later losing his life. Due to living in the latter country he possessed dual citizenship, Bosnian and Dutch.

In July 2019, Medunjanin married Israeli model Moran Rahimi.

Career statistics

Club

International

Scores and results list Bosnia and Herzegovina's goal tally first, score column indicates score after each Medunjanin goal.

Honours
Netherlands U21
UEFA European Under-21 Championship: 2006, 2007

References

External links

Stats at Voetbal International 

1985 births
Living people
Dutch people of Bosnia and Herzegovina descent
Bosnia and Herzegovina emigrants to the Netherlands
Bosnia and Herzegovina refugees
Bosnia and Herzegovina footballers
Dutch footballers
Footballers from Sarajevo
Association football midfielders
Eredivisie players
Eerste Divisie players
AZ Alkmaar players
Sparta Rotterdam players
PEC Zwolle players
La Liga players
Real Valladolid players
Deportivo de La Coruña players
Israeli Premier League players
Maccabi Tel Aviv F.C. players
Süper Lig players
Gaziantepspor footballers
Major League Soccer players
Philadelphia Union players
FC Cincinnati players
Netherlands under-21 international footballers
Bosnia and Herzegovina international footballers
2014 FIFA World Cup players
Dutch expatriate footballers
Bosnia and Herzegovina expatriate footballers
Expatriate footballers in the Netherlands
Expatriate footballers in Spain
Expatriate footballers in Israel
Expatriate footballers in Turkey
Expatriate soccer players in the United States
Dutch expatriate sportspeople in Spain
Bosnia and Herzegovina expatriate sportspeople in the Netherlands
Bosnia and Herzegovina expatriate sportspeople in Spain
Bosnia and Herzegovina expatriate sportspeople in Israel
Bosnia and Herzegovina expatriate sportspeople in Turkey
Bosnia and Herzegovina expatriate sportspeople in the United States